"Winchester Cathedral" is a song by the New Vaudeville Band, a British novelty group established by the song's composer, Geoff Stephens, and was released in late 1966 by Fontana Records.

It reached number 1 in Canada on the RPM 100 chart, co-charting with the Dana Rollin version, and shortly thereafter in the U.S. on the Billboard Hot 100 chart. Stephens was a big fan of tunes from the British music hall era (or what Americans would call "vaudeville"), so he wrote "Winchester Cathedral" in that vein, complete with a Rudy Vallée soundalike
(John Carter) singing through his hands to imitate a megaphone sound. Although the song was recorded entirely by session musicians, when it became an international hit, an actual band had to be assembled, with Fontana trying unsuccessfully to recruit the Bonzo Dog Doo-Dah Band. The recording is one of the few charting songs to feature a bassoon. The band toured extensively under the tutelage of Peter Grant, who later went on to manage The Yardbirds and Led Zeppelin.

The song won the 1967 Grammy Award for Best Contemporary (R&R) Recording, despite not being a rock and roll song. An initial long-playing album including the song was issued in late 1966 by Fontana Records, also titled Winchester Cathedral. Stephens received the 1966 Ivor Novello Award for "Best Song Musically and Lyrically".

In 2016, to celebrate the 50th anniversary of the song's release, a new version by Geoff Stephens was released on CD by Signum Classics, sung by members of the  Winchester Cathedral Choir. The premier performance of this version was to take place during a Gala Concert in Winchester Cathedral on March 12, 2016 to help raise funds for the Cathedral's Appeal.

Chart performance
The tune went to number 4 in the UK Record Retailer chart (now recognised as the official UK Singles Chart for that period).
It went all the way to the top in the U.S., displacing "You Keep Me Hangin' On" by the Supremes on December 3, 1966. After one week at No. 1, "Winchester Cathedral" was knocked off the summit by the Beach Boys' "Good Vibrations", only to rebound to the top spot the next week. After a two-week run, it was knocked off the top for good by The Monkees'  "I'm a Believer"."Winchester Cathedral" also topped the Billboard Easy Listening chart for four weeks.

Global sales of the single were over three million, with the RIAA certification of gold disc status.

Weekly charts

Year-end charts

All-time charts

Cover versions

 Dana Rollin's version, released in October 1966, peaked at number 71 on the Billboard Hot 100.
 Also released in October 1966 was a version by the New Happiness, which bubbled under the Billboard Hot 100 at number 112.
 John Smith and the New Sound released a cover in November 1966 which peaked at number 17 on the German charts.
 Frank Sinatra also recorded it for his 1966 album That's Life. His version was released as a single in Italy and South America in early 1967 and peaked at number 12 on the Italian Musica e dischi chart.
 Rudy Vallée, whose voice and style the original recording imitated, did his own cover of the song in 1967 when he was in his late 60s, on his album Hi Ho Everybody. He also performed the song on Season 3 Episode 12 of the television show Here's Lucy, broadcast on 30 November 1970.

References

1966 singles
Billboard Hot 100 number-one singles
Cashbox number-one singles
Songs written by Geoff Stephens
Petula Clark songs
RPM Top Singles number-one singles
Fontana Records singles